From M.E. to Myself is the twelfth studio album by Singaporean singer JJ Lin, released on 25 December 2015 by Warner Music Taiwan.

The album earned Lin two Golden Melody Awards for Best Mandarin Male Singer and Best Composer for "Twilight".

Track listing

All music produced by JJ Lin.

References 

JJ Lin albums
2015 albums